Flein is a municipality in the district of Heilbronn in Baden-Württemberg in southern Germany.

Geography 
Flein is situated in the south of the district of Heilbronn and directly borders on to Heilbronn in the south.

Neighbouring municipalities 
Neighbouring towns and municipalities of Flein are (clockwise from north-west): Heilbronn (Stadtkreis), Untergruppenbach and Talheim (both in the district of Heilbronn). Flein has combined with Talheim to form a joint association of administrations.

History 

The communal land of Flein settled during the linear pottery culture of the neolithic. The village was first mentioned in 1188 within an imperial document as Flina. The name presumably comes from the Old High German term flins respectively the Middle High German vlins, meaning something like "pebble" or "hard stone".

In 1385, the free imperial city Heilbronn bought the village from the Lords of Sturmfeder. During the German Peasants' War many insurgent farmers of the region assembled in Flein around of their head Jäcklein Rohrbach. Like most of Germany, Flein suffered great damage during the 
Thirty Years' War.

In 1802, Flein became part of Württemberg. The enormous increase of population after World War II is due to the settlement of many refugees and creation of building land a few years later. In the 1970s the population of Flein voted against an incorporation to Heilbronn and for combining a joint association of administrations with Talheim.

Religions 
Apart from an own Protestant parish there's a Catholic one together with Talheim (Catholic Parish Flein-Talheim). The Protestant parish consists of 3,400 members.

Development of population 
1648: 250
1800: 800
1900: 1,600
2005: 6,535

Politics

District council 

Elections in 2014:

Free voters: 8 seats 
CDU/Bürgerliste: 5 seats
SPD: 5 seats
No difference to year 2009.

The mayor is also a member of the district council and its chairman.

Mayor 
On June 24, 2007, there were mayoral elections; the incumbent, Jürgen Schmid did not stand for re-election after 16 years in office. Since there was no absolute majority after the first election a run off was necessary. On July 15, 2007. Alexander Krüger was elected as mayor for an eight-year term with 63.9% of the votes. He started on August 15, 2007.

Coat of arms and flag 
The theme of the municipal coat of arms is the martyrdom of Saint Vitus, derived from a picture in the town's St. Vitus Church (see gallery below). The arms depict a golden cauldron on red flames with a blue background, inside which is the bare, praying Saint Vitus. The municipal flag is yellow and blue.

The holy Vitus is the patron saint of Flein. In Flein, there's the oldest portrayal of his torture, presumably an old seal. The second oldest one is on a stone of 1699. In a description holy Vitus is named in 1865. In a municipal seal it's attested no earlier than 1903. However, since the Reformation no Saints' icons were inserted in the arms, which means that the arms are in fact much older, dating to around 1500 or earlier, making them one of the oldest of the whole district.

The colours of the coats of arms were laid down in 1938 by the head archive of Württemberg. In the same year, the Nazi NSDAP party Heilbronn suggested to accept another arms without a religious meaning. The archive direction suggested a blazon containing an arms In a split sign in blue a head of a lion, behind in gold a blue grape with two vine leaves. However, in June 1939 the NSDAP stated that it was of minor importance and not to hurry the change. So Flein remained with its previous coat of arms and confirmed this decision in 1956. This decision was confirmed on January 11, 1957, by the ministry of the interior of Baden-Württemberg. In the same year local artist Hans Epple created a drawing used by the municipality today (see illustration).

Twin municipalities 
Twin municipalities of Flein are 
 Onzain in the French Département Loir-et-Cher (since March 1990) 
 Steinthaleben in the Kyffhäuserkreis in Thuringia (since June 1991)

Economy and infrastructure 
Flein, situated within the wine region of Württemberg, is known for its famous wine. On 180 ha of vineyards several different varietals such as Riesling, Pinot Meunier and Samtrot grow. These wines are mostly commercialized by the Weingärtnergenossenschaft Flein-Talheim, however there are also private wine-growing estates.

In 1951 Hildegard Seitz from Flein got voted to be wine queen of Württemberg.

Traffic 
Public transport in the HNV is ensured by buses, besides Flein is the only municipality in the district to be connected with the city bus network of Heilbronn. The A 81 is available by Ilsfeld and Untergruppenbach. The nearest rail station is Heilbronn Hauptbahnhof.

Media 
The Heilbronner Stimme informs about happenings in Flein within its edition South-East (SO).

Education 
The primary school and Hauptschule including Werkrealschule Flein is attended by 350 students (2005). Besides there's the Johannesschule, a Förderschule being like a Waldorfschule. The Flein's library has 13,000 media at its disposal (2005).

Culture and sights

Notable buildings 
 Protestant parish church St. Veit, first mentioned in 1233, with war memorial
 old town hall, arms of holy Vitus and initials of Schultheiß (built in 1604, rebuilt in 1834/35, 1895 and after World War II)
 Fischerhaus from 1592 at the Ilsfelder Straße (half-timbering)
 Kornhaus from 1595 (further half-timbering at the der Schulstraße)
 former residence of the sculptor Friedrich Göttle at the Ilsfelder Straße no. 72, 1892 in style of Neo-Renaissance, planned and built by its inhabitant
 fountain in front of the town hall
 outside of the village between vine yards there's the hut of the former Karmeliterkloster monastery

Building sources

Sons and daughters of the municipality 
 Friedrich Michael Münzing (born 1807 in Flein; died 1879 in Heilbronn), Stearinkerzenfabrikant, he approached the synthetic production of sulphuric acid for the first time (around 1830)
 Monika Helbing (born November 16, 1953 in Flein), former member of the second generation of the Red Army Faction and involved in the Schleyer abduction 1977

References

External links 
 www.flein.de (in German)

Heilbronn (district)